Lemon Ice was a German musical duo which released mainly cover versions of songs. It was made up of singer Geeno (real name Gunther Göbbel) and rapper Jay Low. Both originated from Nuremberg.

Beginnings
Under his real name Gunther Göbbel, Geeno reached Final 5 in season 2 of the German Pop Idol series Deutschland sucht den Superstar (DSDS) in 2003/2004 season of. Born on May 6, 1979. Gunther was eliminated in the top 5 round, after receiving 12.58% of the vote. Originally, Göbbel had not advanced to the top 13, but had been brought back as a wildcard and advanced to the Top 5. After the show, Gunther released a Latin-themed single titled "Caramba!" as a part of the duo Meant 2 Be with the German Turkish singer Sedat (full name Sedat Türüc). Gunther Göbbel went on to establish the record label Utopic Music.

After Meant 2 Be, Geeno joined forces with rapper Jay Low whom he met through the live club scene to form Lemon Ice.

Career
Lemon Ice worked with the music producer David Brandes. The debut single of the duo was a hit in Germany and Austria being the cover of single Ben E. King's "Stand By Me". It was released on the label Icezone Music. The accompanying video features Giuliana Marino, German Playmate of the Year 2005. Brandes also managed to place the version on RTL II as background music for the television station's film previews program.

A second single followed, again a cover version of Yazoo's "Only You" with relative success on German, Austrian and Finnish charts. A third single, a cover of Milli Vanilli's "Girl You Know It's True" was a Top 30 hit in Germany.

In 2007 two further singles were released, being covers of Milli Vanilli's "Girl You Know It's True" and Richard Marx' ballad "Right Here Waiting".  Both made the German Top 30. With the latter, the band released their debut and only album One containing the 4 singles and many other cover versions.

Their last release was "Hey Lady" featuring Raheema after which the duo separated.

Discography

Albums

Singles

References

External links
Lemon Ice official website

German pop music groups
Cover bands